On October 25, 2007, the Minister of Health announced that the Government of Canada would establish an expert Sodium Working Group  to explore options for reducing sodium intake and cardiovascular disease among Canadians.

In announcing the creation of the Working Group, the Minister of Health said, "Through the formation of this working group, our Government is taking a major step in helping Canadians improve their health, and the health of their families."

Reactions
Salt-reduction activist and member of the international salt reduction advocacy group WASH (World Action on Salt and Health), Dr. Norm Campbell, president of Blood Pressure Canada said, "This is a wonderful demonstration of the government's leadership in forming collaborations to improve the health of Canadians to prevent stroke, heart and kidney disease -- three of the major causes of death and disability in Canada," says. "Here we have everyone working together for common cause."

Focus
In establishing the Sodium Working Group, Health Canada included representatives from food manufacturing and food service industry groups, health-focused non-governmental organizations, the scientific community, consumer advocacy groups, health professional organizations and government representatives.  The mandate of the Working Group was to develop and oversee the implementation of a strategy for reducing dietary sodium intake among Canadians.

Members

The Working Group has met on several occasions to establish a common knowledge base and to develop strategies for reducing dietary sodium consumption among Canadians. The process that Health Canada is following is patterned after that carried out by the Food Standards Agency in the UK – that is, no discussion of the science, but rather an immediate move to sodium reduction programs and policies.  The concerns over salt are chiefly based upon its ability to affect blood pressure.

Debate
There is some debate on the impact of sodium reduction upon blood pressure.  The salt industry and some food and beverage producers emphasize the heterogeneous impact of sodium on individuals. For example, they observe that about 30% of normotensive individuals experience a drop in blood pressure, while about 20% of normotensive individuals experience an increase in blood pressure - the remaining population showing no effect. As a consequence, some argue that programs to reduce salt will not hold the same benefits for everyone and policies to arbitrarily promote salt reduction will discriminate against a certain segment of the population.  They argue that an across the board reduction in dietary sodium may not be the right approach  and the outcome may lead to unintended consequences for Canadian consumers.

On the other hand, groups concerned with cardiovascular health and nutrition emphasize the overall negative effects of high levels of sodium in the North American diet.  Based upon a study carried out in the US in 1991 on a total of 62 people, the presumption made is that most of the sodium Canadians consume (77%) comes from processed foods sold in grocery stores and in food service outlets. Only about 11% is added during preparation or at the table, with the remainder occurring naturally in foods.  And while the individual benefits of reducing sodium intake are variable, it has been theorized that dietary sodium reduction could eliminate hypertension for over a million Canadians, with a resulting savings of at least 430 million dollars annually in direct high blood pressure management costs (although this has never been confirmed through clinical trials). In other words, while not all Canadians need to reduce their intake of dietary sodium, many have been urged to.  Moreover, theoretical estimates have projected that we may be better off because of a possible reduction of tax-supported health care.

Disbandment
On February 4, 2011, the Ottawa Citizen reported that the Health Canada Sodium Working Group had been disbanded.  The Group had been charged with tracking whether companies were reducing the level of salt in processed foods over the next five years. This follows actions in the United Kingdom to abolish the dietary mandate of the FSA (Food Standards Agency) the government unit most actively involved in salt reduction advocacy.

References

External links
 Member list

Medical and health organizations based in Canada
Edible salt